The Happenings are a pop music group that originated in the 1960s. Members of the original group, created in the spring of 1961 and initially called "The Four Graduates" because all had just graduated from high school in Paterson, New Jersey, were Bob Miranda, David Libert, Tom Giuliano, and Ralph DiVito.  In 1968 DiVito was replaced by Bernie LaPorta and Lenny Conforti also joined to play drums in the touring band. Both LaPorta and Conforti took a hiatus from the northern New Jersey band, the Emerald Experience, to play and tour with the Happenings. That lineup performed mostly at colleges and universities until 1970, when Libert left the band to manage other groups, including George Clinton and Parliament-Funkadelic, Living Colour, Brian Auger, Vanilla Fudge, the Runaways (Cherie Currie, Joan Jett, Lita Ford), Mother's Finest, Alice Cooper and Evelyn "Champagne" King.

Overview
The band's original concept and much of its commercial success came as a cover band playing classic songs in a unique style. Said Miranda, the group's concept was to "take a song that's already proven it could be a hit and put our spin on it". That "spin" consisted of a combination of rich harmonies on vocals and upbeat tempos marked by prominent percussion and sometimes elaborate orchestration. The group later composed its own songs.

The group's major hits were "See You In September" (1966), which was originally recorded by the Tempos in 1959, and a cover version of the George Gershwin/Ira Gershwin song, "I Got Rhythm" (1967), updated for the group's sunshine pop musical style. "See You In September" and "I Got Rhythm" were on the Billboard Hot 100 charts for 14 weeks in 1966 and 13 weeks in 1967, respectively, forming musical bookends for the 1966–1967 school year, based on their Hot 100 #3 peak dates. "I Got Rhythm" and Billy Stewart's "Summertime" also formed Gershwin musical bookends for the same school year, based on the very same Hot 100 peak dates. Disc sales for both "See You in September" and "I Got Rhythm" exceeded one million copies, resulting in R.I.A.A. gold record awards by 1969.

The group had nine Billboard Hot 100 Singles hits from 1966 to 1968, including versions of "Go Away Little Girl" (#12) (a #1 hit for Steve Lawrence in 1963 and later for Donny Osmond in 1971) and "My Mammy" (#13) (popularized by Al Jolson in the 1920s). They also both achieved sales in excess of one million copies, garnering the group another couple of gold records. "Hare Krishna," a version of a song from the musical Hair (1969), was the group's last Hot 100 hit.

The band continues to perform with lead singer Miranda as the only remaining original member.

Discography

Albums

Singles

References

External links
 
 The Happenings' official web site
 Bob Miranda's official web site
 Garfield Cadets website - in 1968 Mike La Neev joined the band as the drummer.

B.T. Puppy Records artists
Jubilee Records artists
American pop music groups
Musical groups established in 1961
Musical groups from New Jersey
1961 establishments in New Jersey